Enchantress is the common primary alias of two fictional characters appearing in American comic books published by Marvel Comics. The first of these is a powerful sorceress with the real name of Amora, one of Thor's greatest enemies. The second Enchantress is the young Sylvie Lushton, who was given great mystic powers by Loki when he created her as a tool for chaos. She models herself after the original Enchantress, Amora.

In the Marvel Cinematic Universe / Disney+ series Loki, Sophia Di Martino portrays Sylvie, a variant of Loki inspired by both the Sylvie Lushton incarnation of the Enchantress as well as Lady Loki.

Publication history

Amora's first appearance in the Marvel Universe took place in Journey into Mystery #103 (April 1964), where she tried and failed to seduce Thor away from Jane Foster.

The second Enchantress, Sylvie, first appeared in Dark Reign: Young Avengers #1 (July 2009), where she was confronted by the Young Avengers.

Fictional character biography

Amora
The Enchantress' parentage is unknown, though it is known she was born in Asgard and has a sister by the name of Lorelei. Amora began learning magic as an apprentice of Karnilla, Queen of the Norns, but was eventually banished. She continued learning magic on her own, notably by seducing others well versed in magic and learning their secrets. In time, Amora became one of the more powerful magic-wielders in Asgard, with her magical arsenal focused on (but not limited to) charming and mind-controlling people. Her by-then well-renowned beauty did not hinder in this.

In her first appearance, she is sent by Odin to eliminate Thor's human love interest, whom Odin sees as a distraction. She also hopes to have the thunder god for herself. She is assisted by a powerful minion — Skurge, the Executioner. The Executioner loved the Enchantress, and she strings him along with her feminine wiles, using him as her muscle. She aids Loki by attempting to seduce Thor in his Don Blake identity and by sending the Executioner to kill Jane Foster. Although the Executioner traps Foster in another dimension, Thor is able to bring her back by giving Skurge his hammer. When the Enchantress begins to turn Skurge into a tree (for returning Foster) Skurge releases Thor from the pact in exchange for his help. Amora then tries to change Thor's hammer into a hissing serpent, but it is immune to her magic. Thor then transports the two back to Asgard.

The Enchantress and the Executioner are exiled to Earth by Odin. They become members of Baron Heinrich Zemo's original Masters of Evil, the opposite number to the Avengers, a superhero team that Thor had joined. The Enchantress hypnotizes Thor into attacking the other Avengers with her own spells and a special brew, making him believe they are enemies of humanity, but Iron Man wakes Thor from his trance by reflecting sunlight into his eyes. Thor sends the Masters to another dimension through a space warp, but two issues later, the Enchantress uses a spell to send them back to Earth. She recruits Wonder Man into the Masters of Evil after paying his bail. She also meets Immortus, who helps Zemo attack the Avengers. When this attempt fails, she turns back time to prevent it from happening, though the Masters retain their memories of this event. When Immortus begins to contact the Masters, the Enchantress prevents this from happening. She then joins in the Masters of Evil's final assault against the Avengers and breaks the Black Knight and Melter out of jail. She manages to escape in the end with the Executioner when the other two are transported to another dimension where their weapons rebound due to different scientific laws. As a member of the Masters of Evil, the Enchantress (and Executioner) repeatedly face the Avengers. She is especially affronted by the attempts of the Scarlet Witch, a mortal, to subvert her divine spells, though she is occasionally genuinely challenged by the Scarlet Witch's mutant gifts.

With the Executioner, she menaces Jane Foster again at Loki's behest.

The Enchantress is also notable in that she has given other superhumans their powers. For example, she used the deceased Zemo's equipment to make a henchman of his, Erik Josten, into the original Power Man, who aids her in battling the Avengers. Her illusions and traps turn the city against the Avengers, forcing them to disband and making Power Man seem like a hero. Captain America, in disguise, corrects this by obtaining a taped confession from the Enchantress and Power Man. Power Man is able to defeat him, but the Enchantress is knocked out by gas from Hawkeye's arrow. Realizing the tape is on its way to the police, the Enchantress used her spells to teleport away. The Enchantress is then recruited by the Mandarin, along with the Executioner, Swordsman, Power Man, and Living Laser for his plan for world domination. With the Executioner, she attacked the Asian sub-continent with an army of trolls, but they were defeated by Hercules and the Scarlet Witch.

Amora poses as the Valkyrie and forms the Lady Liberators, which battle the male Avengers. She dupes Arkon into fighting the Avengers. Amora also uses her magics to make Samantha Parrington and later Barbara Norris into the Valkyrie. With the Executioner, she battles the Defenders and the Thing.

With the Executioner, Amora attempts to conquer Asgard with a troll army. She also served as Loki's lieutenant in his brief rule of Asgard.

During the "Secret Wars," she is placed on the villains's side, but she spurns the idea of fighting a gladiatorial game for the amusement of a higher being. She instead proposes to Thor that the two of them simply join forces, leave both heroes and villains behind, and go back home to Asgard.

On the appearance of Amora's sister Lorelei, it is established that the two sisters have something of a strained relationship, rooted in rivalry. More than a little friction is seen between the pair, not the least due to competition over which one of them would manage to seduce Thor.

The Enchantress joined the Asgardian gods and heroes in final battle against the world-ender Surtur. She establishes that she is motivated by enlightened self-interest: Surtur seeks to end the world, in which case Amora would perish.

Soon after the Surtur War, Thor leads a number of Asgardian heroes to Hel, the realm of the death goddess Hela. The Executioner asks Thor to let him join the expedition for reasons he does not immediately reveal. In truth, he had seen the Enchantress dallying with Heimdall, and, heartbroken, Skurge wishes to lose himself in a noble cause — such as rescuing lost souls from Hela. Thor's forces accomplish their mission but need one man to guard their retreat from Hel by holding the bridge Gjallerbru. The Executioner, knowing there was no more Amora for him, chooses to be that man, giving his life so the others might flee. When Amora hears the news, to everyone's surprise, she is truly grief-stricken.

After Skurge's death, Amora continues her regular hi-jinks, occasionally helping Asgard, occasionally opposing it. She aids Asgard against the evil Egyptian God Seth's legions.

Lorelei later perishes as Amora refused to give her life for her sister's. The deceased Skurge (in Valhalla) rejects the Enchantress, and Amora goes on to empower the Earthman Brute Benhurst into a short-lived new Executioner to serve as her minion in Skurge's stead. Amora becomes vexed with the Avenger Wonder Man and assists Thor and the Warriors Three in their quest to return Odin to the throne of Asgard. During this time, an attraction between Amora and Asgard's guardian Heimdall is explored. Amora even battles the powerful entity Nightmare on behalf of both of them as Heimdall was unable to protect himself at the time. She ultimately rejects Heimdall when she realizes that he wishes to be married and she does not.

In Acts of Vengeance, Amora and Skurge join forces and attack Doctor Strange, only to be bested by Clea when she flies to his aid.

Later, Thor has been spurned by his father Odin, exiled to Earth and disempowered. In this vulnerable state, Thor ends up forming a willing liaison with Amora, with the two of them living out of a loft in New York City as lovers. This status quo would remain until Thor goes missing during Heroes Reborn and is presumed dead.

During Ragnarök, Amora is present with the other Asgardian deities and dwarves when Eitri and his brothers are sealed into a tomb they had carved due to the Mjolnir mold destroying them, albeit accidentally. When Surtur's forging of new Mjolnirs creates chaos, Thor attempts to fly to the skies to discern the source, but is at once struck down by a blast from a Mjolnir duplicate of Loki's; Amora is slain by the same blast, one of the first victims of Loki during this event. Neither her magic nor her inherent durability is capable of shielding her. Heimdall falls soon afterward; Amora is not seen again except, seemingly, in one of the realms of death, unable to use her magic to assist her once-lover.

After Ragnarök, when Thor, Asgard and the other Asgardians return, Thor is manipulated by Loki into inadvertently awakening some of Thor's enemies, among them Amora, though when she was last seen, she is the victim, falling by Loki's hands and mourned by Thor and the other Asgardians. She does not return to Asgard but instead goes to attack the world tree, Yggdrasil in order to resurrect Skurge and release him from Valhalla. Amora is ultimately thwarted after Thor, Loki, and Balder convince her that she is dishonoring his memory with her actions.

She has returned after Thor's resurrection, with Donald Blake - bitter about his separation from Thor and his non-existent past - offering the Enchantress his soul if she can make him a god again. The resulting god is a twisted abomination, with Thor defeating the Enchantress and her new god before banishing them from Asgard, leaving Blake - reduced to a living head after his body was consumed to create the god - connected to a series of dream-weaving creatures to make him dream that he is living a full life.

After this Amora was defeated by Thor and banished to the forest in Norway. She was trapped in an Odinforce barrier and stripped of her powers. Lady Deathstrike and Typhoid Mary were on a quest to find Arkea, an intelligent gestalt microorganism capable of controlling machines and people. They found Amora and offered to help her regain her powers. In exchange they founded a new sisterhood to battle the X-Men, who were hunting Arkea and Lady Deathstrike. Arkea hacked the Odinforce spell and restored Amora's full powers. In exchange for this, Amora restored the physical form of the immortal mutant witch, Selene, and helped Arkea resurrect Madelyne Pryor. Before the Sisterhood could add more members, the X-Men attacked and killed Arkea. Amora was ambushed by the X-Man M, who defeated her in a surprise attack. However, Madelyne Pryor swore to continue the Sisterhood, which presently has Madelyne, Selene, Lady Deathstrike, Amora, and Typhoid Mary as members.

During the "AXIS" storyline, Enchantress appears as a member of Magneto's unnamed supervillain group during the fight against Red Skull's Red Onslaught form. After the heroes and villains present at the battle experience a moral inversion due to the Scarlet Witch and Doctor Doom's attempt to bring out the Xavier in Onslaught backfiring, Magneto recruits Enchantress as one of his new 'Avengers' to stop the now-villainous Avengers and X-Men.

Following the "Secret Wars" storyline, she has become a member of Malekith the Accursed's Dark Council. Through a spell, she takes control of the queen of the Light Elves, allowing her marriage to Malekith to happen and the conquest of their realm.

During the "War of the Realms" storyline, Enchantress accompanies Malekith the Accursed in his invasion on Midgard. She and Kurse fight Ghost Rider and She-Hulk until Jane Foster slams Skidbladnir into Enchantress. In Uruguay, the Enchantress raises the dead, but Ghost Rider, Doctor Strange, and Balder ward her off.

Sylvie Lushton

A member of the Young Masters surfaces having modeled herself on Amora the Enchantress and takes on her teammate Melter as her lover. The new Enchantress is revealed to be an adolescent who had been given powers by Loki so that he could use her in his schemes. However, she truly believes that she is an Asgardian that had been exiled from Asgard and sent to live in New York where she joined the Young Masters. She admits to the first team of Young Avengers that she is Sylvie Lushton from Broxton, Oklahoma, who suddenly gained magic powers. Sylvie seems to have powers and abilities similar to those of the original Enchantress, despite looking far younger, and speaking with a noticeable lisp. Sylvie has a strong desire to become a Young Avenger and even used her magic to change her teammates' minds so that they would want her on the team as well.

After a series of try-outs, Sylvie is initially accepted as a new addition to the Young Avengers. However, as a plan to end Sylvie's future with the Young Avengers, her teammates Big Zero and Egghead download the results of an analysis they had run on her into the Vision's cybernetic mind. The analysis verifies that Sylvie is an unwitting trap for the Young Avengers' magical defense systems created by Loki and Wiccan immediately has her banned from the Young Avengers' hideout. A distraught and confused Sylvie then asks her teammates to avenge her, eventually resulting in a confrontation between the two teams and Norman Osborn's team of Dark Avengers. During the conflict, Wiccan reveals to her that she was given magical powers by Loki. However, he states that the team still wants her, but that her hasty banning was only to quickly remove her from the premises so that he could alter the magical defenses to compensate for Loki's traps. Convinced by Wiccan that being an Avenger is about who one chooses to be despite one's origins, she, Coat of Arms, and Wiccan manage to magically remove the Sentry from the battlefield and turn the tide of the fight against the Young Masters and the Dark Avengers. Melter requests a quick escape so that they can have more time to decide what they will choose to do as either superheroes or supervillains, and Sylvie complies, teleporting the Young Masters away.

Enchantress eventually returns, this time in the employ of Jeremy Briggs. She attempts to assist Jeremy in his goal of stripping Earth's superhumans of their powers, but abandons him after being injured by White Tiger. She later battles the Fearless Defenders as a hired enforcer of Caroline le Fey, but is defeated.

In the "Avengers Undercover" series, Enchantress was with the Young Masters when they are seen as members of the Shadow Council's Masters of Evil where the Young Masters make their headquarters in Constrictor's Snakepit.

In the "All-New, All-Different Marvel," Enchantress joins up with Hood's incarnation of the Illuminati. It is later revealed that the current Enchantress of the new Illuminati is actually Sylvie with the original "Enchantress" being an assumed name.  She is eventually confronted by the original Enchantress, who banishes her to a hostile realm.

Powers and abilities
The Enchantress is a member of the race of superhumans known as Asgardians, and as such possesses superhuman strength, speed, stamina, and durability but prefers to avoid physical conflicts. She possesses an innate capacity to manipulate ambient magical energy, honed through practice for a variety of effects, including projecting magical power bolts, interdimensional teleportation of multiple Asgardians and non-Asgardians, protective energy shields, illusion casting, levitation, conjuration, transmutation (even of Asgardians), telekinesis, time-disruption, mind switching, and mind control. She has used her sorcery to enhance her natural beauty and allure, and to enchant her lips so that by kissing virtually any man she can make him her slave for about a week, unless she renews the treatment. She can also use her magic to heal any of her injuries rapidly, and possesses limited mystical senses. She can also absorb an opponent's life force to temporarily increase her own powers. A prolonged absence from Asgard tends to diminish her powers although they never fade completely. The Enchantress has been described as one of the most powerful sorceresses in Asgard, second only to Karnilla, although their every direct confrontation has ended in a stalemate until interrupted. However, Amora's sister Lorelei was later also enhanced beyond her own abilities. The Enchantress has a gifted intellect, and possesses extensive knowledge of Asgardian mystic and amatory arts. On occasion, the Enchantress employs various mystical artifacts, potions, and power objects, such as the crystalline gem in which she entrapped Brunnhilde the Valkyrie's soul, and the potion she used to increase her hypnotic power over Thor in The Avengers #7. It has been shown that Enchantress is unable to access her spells when her hands are bound and her mouth is gagged.

Initially unbeknownst to her, Enchantress II's powers are given to her by Loki. Wiccan states that she may not fully understand how powerful she truly is. Her powers and abilities appear similar to those of the original Enchantress. She is able to teleport many people instantly, maintain a secret fortress with her magic, and transform objects and people into whatever she desires, such as turning several henchmen into frogs. She also demonstrated power enough to stop both the Young Avengers and Young Masters during their battle and separate them.

Connection to Norse mythology
Unlike many of Marvel's Asgardians, Amora is not actually based on a goddess from Norse mythology. In the limited series Thor: Ages of Thunder the Enchantress is said to have been referred to by many names throughout history including; Freyja, Gefn and Iduna, and is linked to many of the myths associated with these goddesses (e.g. as keeper of the golden apples). However, these stories were set during previous cycles of Ragnarok and characters based on some of these goddesses (Freya and Idunn) exist separately in the current Marvel Universe.

Reception

Critical reception 
Drew Atchison of Screen Rant referred to the Enchantress as one of the "best Thor villains from the comics," writing, "Magic is used a lot in comics. Many use it for good but some like Amora the Enchantress, use it for far more villainous and vile reasons. A powerful Asgardian witch, Amora has cast powerful spells over Thor, Asgard, and other characters, making herself an iconic foe that the thunderer always seems to face at some point." Sara Century of Syfy called the Enchantress a "feminist dreambae," saying, "Amora the Enchantress first showed up way back in Journey Into Mystery #103 (1964), and she’s been punking most of the Marvel Universe ever since. Amora arrived on the scene to assist Loki in taking Thor down, and their inevitable failure kicked off a long and storied career for her as a bae with a dark side. As one of mainstream comics' few female characters fully in control of her own sexual agency, and one of the Thor series' most sympathetic villains, Amora hasn’t always been written perfectly, but she’s definitely always been an object of our affections. Being bae is quite literally her superpower." Jesse Schedeen and Joshua Yehl of IGN said, "Thor is happy to battle Frost Giants, Fire Demons, and dragons all day long -- if it can be smashed with a hammer, it's right up his alley. That's why The Enchantress is one of his greatest villains; her schemes can't be overcome simply by swinging at it with Mjolnir. A skilled trickster and sorceress, the Enchantress won’t rest until she possesses everything she desires. And it just so happens that she desires the god of thunder." 

Adjanni Ramos of CBR.com wrote, "Amora the Enchantress working alongside Loki in a plot against Thor is as classic as the Sinister Six fighting Spider-Man. Ever since early Thor comics, Amora and Loki have worked together because of a common goal to defeat the God of Thunder; although, in Amora's case, it's usually to make him fall for her. Some iterations of the duo have even depicted Amora as having feelings for Loki, but the two have always served as classic Thor-Villains Duo." Noah Bell of Collider stated, "The Enchantress, known as Amora, is a skilled sorceress and master manipulator. One of Thor's most iconic villains, a live-action depiction of the character seems long overdue at this point. With her focus on manipulation and mind games, Amora could be an interesting change of pace for villains in the Thor franchise. While Thor has gotten out of most situations with his strength, an encounter with the Enchantress could show more of the Asgardian's brains in action." Marc Buxton of Den of Geek asserted, "Amora was a founding member of the Masters of Evil and it is about time Marvel focus their energies on a worthy female adversary for their heroes. It can be argued that she is the greatest villainess in the Marvel Universe and it is time the world came under Amora’s spell."

Accolades 

 In 2018, Den of Geek included the Enchantress in their "Thor 4: The Marvel Villains We Want to See" list.
 In 2019, CBR.com ranked the Enchantress 10th in their "20 Powerful Female Marvel Characters We Hope To See In The MCU's Phase Four" list and included her in their "Thor 4: Five Characters We Hope to See in the MCU Sequel" list.
 In 2019, IGN ranked the Enchantress 23rd in their "Top 25 Marvel Villains" list.
 In 2020, Scary Mommy included the Enchantress in their "195+ Marvel Female Characters Are Truly Heroic" list.
 In 2020, CBR.com ranked the Enchantress 9th in their "Marvel Comics: The Strongest Magic Users" list.
 In 2022, Collider included the Enchantress in their "Thor: 10 Characters We Want to See in a Fifth Movie" list.
 In 2022, Screen Rant ranked the Enchantress 7th in their "17 Best Thor Villains From The Comics" list and included her in their "10 Most Powerful Asgardian Gods In Marvel Comics" list.
 In 2022, The Mary Sue ranked the Enchantress 8th in their "All of Thor’s Love Interests in Marvel Comics" list.
 In 2022, Sideshow included the Enchantress in their "Marvel’s Most Masterful Witches" list.
 In 2022, CBR.com ranked the Enchantress 5th in their "10 Deadliest Female Villains In Marvel Comics" list and 7th in their "10 Strongest Asgardians In The Comics" list.
 In 2022, Screen Rant included Amora the Enchantress in their "10 Marvel Comics Gods Who Should Join The MCU Next" list.

Other versions

Heroes Reborn
An alternate version of Amora the Enchantress appears in the Heroes Reborn universe. She approaches the Scarlet Witch with the revelation that she was her daughter. This was a ruse as she wanted to use Wanda in Loki's plans to defeat the Avengers.

Marvel Zombies
An Earth-2149 Amora the Enchantress becomes a zombie in Marvel Zombies vs. The Army of Darkness as part of Marvel Zombies miniseries. She is imprisoned in the castle of Dr. Doom so that she does not contaminate the people. She masks her true decayed appearance with magic and portrays herself as a non-zombie to attract the attention of Ash so that she can be freed. Upon her release, she infects Dazzler—who was trying to show Ash what was going on—by biting off her finger. Doctor Doom, understanding Dazzler and Enchantress were beyond hope, kills them both.

Old Man Logan
In the pages of "Old Man Logan" that took place on Earth-21923, a flashback by the elderly Logan showed that Enchantress was among the villains who came together to take over the world. When in Manhattan, Enchantress fought She-Hulk, Daredevil, and Moon Knight. After Punisher killed Electro, Enchantress casts a spell that caused the sounds to be amplified enough for Daredevil's senses to go into overload for his head to explode. Enchantress is among the villains that attack Danielle Cage's group in Osborn City where they were killed by the insects summoned by Dwight Barrett's Ant-Man helmet.

Rule of Thor
In an alternate future where Thor conquers Earth seemingly for its own good, Amora the Enchantress marries Thor and they produce a child named Magni. This Enchantress and the entire future are neutralized when Thor realizes he has been acting without honor and travels back in time to warn his past self.

Ultimate Marvel
In the Ultimate Marvel universe, Amora appeared in New Ultimates #2 aiding Loki and a team of Asgardians who attempted to take down the New Ultimates. She seemingly has the power of persuasion to make people do whatever she wants. She convinces Valkyrie, Carol Danvers, and Zarda to betray the Ultimates. They win the fight against them, but later the remaining Ultimates return to fight them again. They manage to free them from Amora's spell by having Hawkeye shoot an arrow at Amora, almost killing her and breaking her concentration on the spell. Amora was angry at Loki for putting her in that position and decided to leave. Before she left, she warned him that now that Valkyrie died during the fight, Thor would have his revenge on him.

In other media

Television
 Amora the Enchantress appears in the "Captain America" and "The Mighty Thor" segments of The Marvel Super Heroes, voiced by Peg Dixon.
 Amora the Enchantress appears in The Super Hero Squad Show episode "Mental Organism Designed Only for Kisses!", voiced by Grey DeLisle.
 Amora the Enchantress appears in The Avengers: Earth's Mightiest Heroes, voiced by Kari Wahlgren. She works with the Executioner and Heinrich Zemo to bring the Masters of Evil together and oppose the Avengers on Loki's behalf. Following Zemo's betrayal however, the Enchantress seeks revenge on her former group, but Wonder Man causes them to disappear when they both attempted to claim a Norn Stone and the Enchantress falls under Surtur's control.
 Amora the Enchantress appears in Avengers Assemble, voiced by Fryda Wolff. In the two-part episode "Avengers No More", she appears as a member of the Cabal, who collaborate to build a static expander capable of freezing the Avengers in place and scattering them across time and space. Even in spite of the New Avengers' interference, the Cabal succeed in their plans. In the episode "Under the Spell of the Enchantress", she brainwashes Thor to serve as her bodyguard, but Captain Marvel and Ms. Marvel free him. In the episode "Underworld", the Enchantress attempts to manipulate the Avengers into facilitating her escape from Battleworld, only to be apparently destroyed by one of the Beyonder's traps.
 Amora the Enchantress appears in Marvel Future Avengers, voiced by Ayumi Yonemaru in Japanese and Kari Wahlgren in English. This version is a member of the Masters of Evil.
 Sophia Di Martino portrays Sylvie, a female variant of Loki, in the Marvel Cinematic Universe / Disney+ series Loki. While Sylvie was inspired by the Sylvie Lushton incarnation of the Enchantress and Lady Loki, she is a different character with a different backstory from both of them.

Film
 Amora the Enchantress appears in Hulk vs. Thor voiced again by Kari Wahlgren.
 Amora the Enchantress makes a minor appearance in Thor: Tales of Asgard, voiced by Ashleigh Ball.

Video games
 Amora the Enchantress appears as a boss in Marvel: Ultimate Alliance voiced by Gabrielle Carteris. This version is a lieutenant in Doctor Doom's Masters of Evil.
 Amora the Enchantress appears in Marvel Super Hero Squad Online, voiced by Grey DeLisle.
 Amora the Enchantress appears as a boss, later playable character, Marvel: Avengers Alliance.
 A teenage version of Amora the Enchantress appears in Marvel Avengers Academy, voiced by Laura Bailey.
 Amora the Enchantress appears as a boss and playable character in Marvel Future Fight.
 Amora the Enchantress appears as a playable character in Lego Marvel's Avengers, as part of the "Masters of Evil" DLC pack.

Toys
 Enchantress received a figurine in The Classic Marvel Figurine Collection.
 An Enchantress figure was released in a two-pack with Thor in the third wave of Secret Wars figures from Hasbro's 3.75" Marvel Universe line.
 An Enchantress figure was released in the fourth collector's pack of the Marvel Super Hero Squad line.
 An Enchantress figure was released in  "The Raft", the San Diego Comic Con 2016 exclusive set for Hasbro's 6" Marvel Legends line. The same figure was later released separately with a slightly different paint job.

Tabletop games 
 Enchantress appears in the HeroClix Collectible Miniatures Game.
 Enchantress has been announced for the Marvel Crisis Protocol Miniatures Game.

References

External links
 Enchantress (Amora) at Marvel.com
 Sylvie at Marvel.com

Characters created by Jack Kirby
Characters created by Stan Lee
Comics characters introduced in 1964
Female characters in film
Fictional characters who can manipulate time
Fictional characters with absorption or parasitic abilities
Fictional characters with elemental and environmental abilities
Fictional characters with elemental transmutation abilities
Fictional characters with energy-manipulation abilities
Fictional characters with slowed ageing
Fictional characters with superhuman durability or invulnerability
Fictional goddesses
Fictional hypnotists and indoctrinators
Fictional illusionists
Marvel Comics Asgardians
Marvel Comics characters who can move at superhuman speeds
Marvel Comics characters who can teleport
Marvel Comics characters who have mental powers
Marvel Comics characters who use magic
Marvel Comics characters with accelerated healing
Marvel Comics characters with superhuman strength
Marvel Comics female supervillains
Marvel Comics telekinetics
Marvel Comics telepaths
Marvel Comics witches
Villains in animated television series